The V Army Corps / V AK was a corps level command of the Prussian and then the Imperial German Armies from the 19th century to World War I.

Originating in 1815 as the General Command for the Grand Duchy of Posen (later called the Province of Posen) with headquarters in Posen.  Its catchment area included the Regierungsbezirk (administrative district) Posen and Regierungsbezirk Liegnitz from the Province of Silesia.

The Corps served in the Austro-Prussian War. During the Franco-Prussian War it was assigned to the 3rd Army.

In peacetime the Corps was assigned to the VIII Army Inspectorate but joined the 5th Army at the start of the First World War.  It was still in existence at the end of the war in Armee-Abteilung C, Heeresgruppe Gallwitz on the Western Front.  The Corps was disbanded with the demobilisation of the German Army after World War I.

Austro-Prussian War
V Corps fought in the Austro-Prussian War in 1866, seeing action in the Battle of Königgrätz.

Franco-Prussian War
During the Franco-Prussian War the Corps joined the 3rd Army.  It saw action in the opening battles of Weissenburg and Wörth, in the Battle of Sedan and in the Siege of Paris.

Peacetime organisation 
The 25 peacetime Corps of the German Army (Guards, I - XXI, I - III Bavarian) had a reasonably standardised organisation. Each consisted of two divisions with usually two infantry brigades, one field artillery brigade and a cavalry brigade each.  Each brigade normally consisted of two regiments of the appropriate type, so each Corps normally commanded 8 infantry, 4 field artillery and 4 cavalry regiments. There were exceptions to this rule:
V, VI, VII, IX and XIV Corps each had a 5th infantry brigade (so 10 infantry regiments)
II, XIII, XVIII and XXI Corps had a 9th infantry regiment
I, VI and XVI Corps had a 3rd cavalry brigade (so 6 cavalry regiments)
the Guards Corps had 11 infantry regiments (in 5 brigades) and 8 cavalry regiments (in 4 brigades).
Each Corps also directly controlled a number of other units. This could include one or more
Foot Artillery Regiment
Jäger Battalion
Pioneer Battalion
Train Battalion

World War I

Organisation on mobilisation 
On mobilization on 2 August 1914 the Corps was restructured.  9th Cavalry Brigade was withdrawn to form part of the 5th Cavalry Division and the 10th Cavalry Brigade was broken up and its regiments assigned to the divisions as reconnaissance units.  77th Infantry Brigade was assigned to the 10th Reserve Division with the V Reserve Corps.  Divisions received engineer companies and other support units from the Corps headquarters.  In summary, V Corps mobilised with 25 infantry battalions, 9 machine gun companies (54 machine guns), 8 cavalry squadrons, 24 field artillery batteries (144 guns), 4 heavy artillery batteries (16 guns), 3 pioneer companies and an aviation detachment.

Combat chronicle 
On mobilisation, V Corps was assigned to the 5th Army forming part of centre of the forces for the Schlieffen Plan offensive in August 1914 on the Western Front.

It was still in existence at the end of the war in Armee-Abteilung C, Heeresgruppe Gallwitz on the Western Front.

Commanders 
The V Corps had the following commanders during its existence:

See also 

Franco-Prussian War order of battle
German Army order of battle (1914)
German Army order of battle, Western Front (1918)
List of Imperial German infantry regiments
List of Imperial German artillery regiments
List of Imperial German cavalry regiments
Poznań Fortress

References

Bibliography 
 
 
 
 
 

Corps of Germany in World War I
Military units and formations established in 1815
Military units and formations disestablished in 1919